The 1916 Portsmouth by-election was a parliamentary by-election held for the British House of Commons constituency of Portsmouth on 15 January 1916.  The seat had become vacant when Lord Charles Beresford (one of the constituency's two Conservative Members of Parliament) was elevated to peerage as Baron Beresford.

The Conservative candidate, Hon. Sir Hedworth Meux, was returned unopposed. He held the seat until the constituency was divided at the 1918 general election, and did not stand for Parliament again.

References

Sources

See also 
 Portsmouth (UK Parliament constituency)
 1900 Portsmouth by-election
 The town (now city) of Portsmouth
 List of United Kingdom by-elections (1900–1918)

1916 in England
1916 elections in the United Kingdom
By-elections to the Parliament of the United Kingdom in Hampshire constituencies
Unopposed by-elections to the Parliament of the United Kingdom (need citation)
Elections in Portsmouth
20th century in Hampshire
January 1916 events